Freddie Brown captained the English cricket team in Australia in 1950–51, playing as England in the 1950-51 Ashes series against the Australians and as the MCC in their other matches on the tour. They were regarded as a weak team - some critics wanted to cancel the tour - and failed to regain the Ashes. However, these facts do not tell the whole story as the inspirational Brown exposed flaws in the powerful Australian team. By winning the Fifth and final Test he ended Australia's record of 26 Tests without defeat and paved the way for England's victories in 1953, 1954-55 and 1956.

Selection
The 1950-51 side under Freddie Brown...was full of inexperienced players and we paid the penalty. I'm sure if we had selected one or two solid players such as Jack Robertson, Dennis Brookes, Jack Ikin and Bill Edrich we would have won the Ashes - in spite of once again being caught on a glue-pot at Brisbane. Two Tests were lost by a very small margin and we won the last. In addition Denis Compton was a complete failure in the Tests, scoring only 53 runs in four matches. In spite of the critics the bowling proved adequate and Freddie Brown did a grand job in view of the shortcomings of the side. To me the annoying part was that we had players in England who could have won the series for us.
Alec Bedser

In selecting their team for Australia the MCC selectors (Sir Pelham Warner, Harry Altham, Gubby Allen, Les Ames, William Findlay, Tom Pearce, Walter Robins, Brian Sellers and Bob Wyatt) made the mistake on relying on experience on one hand and youth on the other, but with little between. In this they were not helped by the hole left in English cricket by the Second World War, but only three players (Godfrey Evans, Trevor Bailey and Reg Simpson) were aged between 26 and 31 and could be said to be at their prime; nine of the players were 32 or more and six 26 or less. The captain Freddie Brown had last toured Australia in 1932–33 with Douglas Jardine and Len Hutton, Cyril Washbrook, Denis Compton, Doug Wright, Alec Bedser and Godfrey Evans in 1946-47 under Wally Hammond; the rest of the team had never travelled down under. Bill Edrich who had made a gutsy 462 runs (46.20) in 1946-47 and would tour Australia again in 1954–55, but was out of favour at Lord's (he was being divorced, and such things counted in the 1950s) and had had an injury-struck season. The two biggest wicket-takers of 1950 were the top spinners Jim Laker and Johnny Wardle. Laker had taken an astounding 8/2 in the 1950 Bradford Test Trial, but his brand of off-spin was deemed too slow for the hard Australian pitches and he was not chosen for the 1954-55 tour either. In the 1956 Ashes series he took 46 wickets (9.60) including 19/90 at Old Trafford and when he finally toured Australia in 1958-59 he took 15 wickets (21.20). The Yorkshireman Johnny Wardle was also left behind, but would finish with 102 Test wickets (20.39) with his combination of Slow Left Arm bowling and Chinamen. To be fair to the selectors Laker had only taken 32 Test wickets (37.34) at the time and Wardle just 2 (56.50). The MCC were committed to a youth policy that consistently failed them. In 1950 they relied overly on young undergraduates from Cambridge University and had lost 3–1 to the West Indies as a result. A continuation of this policy was unlikely to succeed in Australia, but John Dewes, David Sheppard and John Warr were chosen for the tour along with the young professionals Brian Close, Gilbert Parkhouse and Bob Berry. They all failed when faced with real class and only served to increase the burden on the senior players. Remembering his torrid time in 1946-47 Cyril Washbrook declined to tour when selected, but was later flown out with Roy Tattersall and Brian Statham. Washbrook's fears were full realised, Tattersall failed and Statham would not make his Test debut until the party reached New Zealand. Freddie Brown was the selector's third choice to lead the tour, after Norman Yardley of Yorkshire and George Mann of Middlesex both declined the job and he was only chosen as Lord's was determined to have an amateur captain. It was a thankless job as even with the retirement of the great Don Bradman it was clear that Australia were the stronger team and would be hard to beat on their own ground. They had defeated Wally Hammond 3–0 in 1946-47 and Yardley 4–0 in 1948 and England had not won a Test against them in twelve years.

Managers
There were two managers of equal rank; Brigadier Michael Green, a career Army officer who had played for Gloucester and Essex and was the Secretary of Worcestershire County Cricket Club, was in charge of the social calendar and public relations, and John Nash, Secretary of Yorkshire County Cricket Club since 1931, controlled the finances. This was the last tour of the 70-year-old scorer Bill Ferguson, who had toured with the MCC since 1907-08 and devised the famous Ferguson Charts which gave greater details than other scorecards, noting who bowled each ball, who batted and where it was fielded. He also invented the radial scoring chart which show the directions in which a batsman scored his runs.

Captain
England's popular captain did a magnificent job both as an individual unit of the Test team and as captain of it. His unstinted devotion to his job and the unselfish manner in which he delved in with a will when the going was hardest won the admiration of all Australian enthusiasts and met a fitting reward when England emerged victorious from the Fifth Test at the end of the tour.
Bill O'Reilly

Frederick Richard Brown was a veteran of Douglas Jardine's Bodyline side of 1932-33 and was Wisden Cricketer of the Year in 1933. Born in Peru and educated in Chile and Cambridge University he was a big-hearted, self-confident red-headed all-rounder usually seen wearing a white silk handkerchief round his neck, with a big grin and an avuncular pipe. Over six feet tall and weighing 15 stone (over 200lbs or 100 kilos) he loved to attack the bowling. Captured with Bill Bowes at Tobruk in 1942 Brown spent most of the Second World War in prisoner-of-war camps in Italy and Germany, where they organised games of cricket, baseball and rugby and lost over 60lbs (30 kilos) before being liberated by the Americans. A leg-spinner for Surrey before the war he became a medium-paced seamer in the late 1940s and organised cricket while working as a welfare officer in a Doncaster colliery. When the coal mines were nationalised Brown lost his job and became the captain and assistant-secretary of Northamptonshire County Cricket Club in 1949. From being in seventeenth and last place in the County Championship in 1948 (and failing to win a county match between 1934 and 1939) Brown led Northants to sixth place in 1949. He was rotated in the England captaincy in 1949–50 with George Mann and Norman Yardley without success. He drew twice against a weak New Zealand in 1949 and lost to the West Indies in 1950. After Mann and Yardley had turned down the Ashes tour Brown impressed the selectors by hitting a six into the Lord's Pavilion while smashing 122 out of 131 runs inside two hours as captain in the Gentlemen v Players match, followed with three quick wickets, and he was offered the post the same afternoon. This was still the age when the England captain had to be a gentleman, even if he was a 'passenger' in the team, Brown having made only 233 runs (23.30) and taken 14 wickets (40.79) in his 9 Tests. Despite his age (he turned 40 on tour) Brown had the most successful series of any England captain in Australia; Taking 18 wickets (21.61) and making 210 runs (26.25), third in the batting averages (behind Len Hutton and Reg Simpson) and in the bowling averages (behind Trevor Bailey and Alec Bedser). Brown's jovial bonhomie and refusal to admit defeat won him many fans in Australia and he was a magnificent ambassador for the game, a role which the MCC regarded quite as important as sporting success, and the scorer Bill Ferguson said it was the easiest, happiest tour he had been on for over 40 years. After losing 4–1 to Australia he won 1–0 in New Zealand and beat South Africa 3–1 at home in 1951. At 42 he was recalled to the England team for the 1953 Lord's Test, where took 4/82 and hit 50 runs to ensure a vital draw in the year England regained the Ashes. Like many amateur captains he was happy to take advice from the senior professional and 'Brown conferred with Len Hutton before he made a bowling change...there was little room for doubt...that Brown had tremendous respect for Hutton's advice on the cricket field', as well he should as the Yorkshireman was recognised as 'a tactical genius, whose advice was often sought', Actually making a northern professional vice-captain was a step too far and this office was granted to the debonair Middlesex batsman Denis Compton, the first professional cricketer to hold that office in living memory. Though Brown also conferred with Compton on the field, it was only after he had spoken to Hutton. The young Trevor Bailey surprised everybody by drawing up plans for dismissing and containing every Australian batsmen, which were used to great effect in the series.

Batting
All Australia honoured Hutton as the world's best batsman, and never did a man play harder or more successfully on his country's behalf...One man cannot make a cricket team, but Len Hutton did the next best thing in Australia last winter. He stood alone. Superb in craftsmanship, magnificent in the hour of stress, veritably a giant among all batsmen and worthy of ranking with such famous names as Hobbs, Sutcliffe, Woolley, Hammond...they were masters of all they surveyed. So was Hutton.
John Kay

Rarely has the batting of a team been so dominated by one man as Len Hutton did the England side of 1950–51. He made 533 runs at an average of 88.83, 50 runs more than the next man Reg Simpson (38.77) and all the others except Freddie Brown (26.25) averaged under 20. He had broken his left arm in an accident on a commando course while a sergeant in the Army Physical Training Corps in the war and after an operation using 46 stitches, grafting bone from his leg onto his arm, which was left 2 inches (5 cm) shorter and weaker than his right. He was forced to review his technique and use a lightened bat, but his defence was flawless and he was an expert on 'sticky dogs' like Brisbane and averaged higher in post-war Tests than in his youth, when he had made the record score of 364 at the Oval in 1938. The Yorkshireman was saddled with the heavy burden of knowing that England depended on his skill and was the prime target of the Australian fast bowlers Keith Miller and Ray Lindwall. Of Jack Iverson Hutton told Miller "Ah'll show thee how to play 'im", but never quite fathomed his mystery spin. England had one other great batsmen, the 'golden boy' Denis Compton whose heroic strokeplay had enthralled the crowds in 1946-47 and 1948. Unlike Hutton he had no inhibition about playing his shots, but had spent much of 1950 suffering from the knee injury that would plague his career. He went on the tour against the advice of his doctor, who warned that his leg may be immobilised and took pain-killing drugs throughout the visit. It is unlikely that any batsman has had such a checked tour as Compton in 1950–51, he averaged 7.57 in the Tests and 92.11 in the other First Class matches, a difference of nearly 85 runs. His loss of form at the highest level was a severe blow to England's chances. Reg Simpson came a poor second to Hutton in the Test averages, his 349 runs (38.77) being almost entirely dependent on his 156 not out on his 31st birthday in the Fifth and final Test. This innings was the finest of his career, first adding 131 with Hutton and 64 out of a stand of 74 for the last wicket to put England 103 runs ahead and gave them their first victory against Australia since 1938. It was the highest score of his Test career and he also made 269, his highest First Class hundred against the Sheffield Shield Champions New South Wales. He was a fearless and effective player of fast bowling, but had a habit of getting out to spin bowlers, who he regarded with contempt. Hutton's regular opening partner was the Lancashire stalwart Cyril Washbrook, with whom he added 359 against South Africa in 1948–49, still a record opening stand for England. He averaged over 50 against Don Bradman's 1948 Australians, but couldn't handle the mystery spin of Jack Iverson. Apart from the captain's own efforts - Freddie Brown came third in the England Test averages with 210 runs at 26.25 - the rest of the England batting was woefully poor. John Dewes had amassed 1,262 runs (78.88) for Cambridge and 739 (61.58) for Middlesex in 1950 with defensive prods and pushes. For Cambridge he added 343 vs the West Indies and 349 vs Sussex with David Sheppard, but they fared worse when not playing on the friendly wicket at Fenner's. Sheppard is best remembered for taking holy orders, becoming the first Reverend to play Test cricket, becoming captain of Sussex and England and later Bishop of Liverpool. Gilbert Parkhouse was a Welsh middle order batsman who was sent in to open for Glamorgan in 1950 and made such as success of it that he broke the county record by making seven centuries in a season. The teenage Brian Close was chosen after he took 100 wickets and made 1,000 runs in 1949 and became England's youngest ever player aged 18 years and 149 days. Despite respectable all-round figures Close never reached the heights expected of him in Test cricket, though his tough, uncompromising, captaincy of Yorkshire, Somerset and England would become the stuff of legend. Trevor Bailey's barnacle-like qualities were already apparent and this notorious stonewaller tended to substitute stubbornness for strokeplay, though he made few runs in this series.

Bowling
With thirty Test Match wickets to his name, Alec Bedser founded England's eventual success. He toiled for hours without complaint, and never once looked annoyed at the missing of a catch, or at a rejected l.b.w. appeal. A great bowler, and an example to all who aspire to cricketing fame. The schoolboys who cheered him, and the elderly folk who applauded politely, all realised one thing. In Alec Bedser England had the best bowler Australia had seen for years, and friend and foe alike admitted the fact.
John Kay

Alec Bedser dominated the England bowling (and the Australian batsmen) as much as Len Hutton did the batting and by the end of the tour the Australians rated him the best new-ball bowler in the world. He sent down almost twice as many overs as anybody else in the Tests and took 30 wickets (16.06), including 10/105 in England's final victory at Melbourne. Bedser carried the England bowling on his broad back against in the 1940s and 1950s with a long list of short-term new-ball partners. His huge hands and powerful shoulders allowed him to bowl a lethal combination of in-swingers and leg-cutters off a short run-up and only Keith Miller - briefly - was able to cut loose from his control. In 1950–51 series he did have the support of his captain Freddie Brown, another big medium paced bowler, who surprised everybody by taking 18 wickets (21.61) despite celebrating his 40th birthday on the tour. There was also Trevor Bailey who took 14 wickets (14.14) with his naggingly accurate out-swingers that mirrored his monotonous batting as he settled on containing batsmen, but could be dangerous in the right conditions. After these three the quality of the England bowling dropped dramatically, for which the selectors must bear the brunt of the blame. Doug Wright was a mercurial leg-spinner who the MCC liked sent on tour instead of Jim Laker because he was more suited to the harder wickets abroad. He was potential match-winner, but he liked to buy his wickets and asking him to bowl was always a gamble as he could equally snap up a few quick wickets, concede a slew of runs, or both. Eric Hollies bowled one of the most famous balls in cricket when his googly dismissed Don Bradman for a duck in his last Test innings, but the Warwickshire leg-spinner was not a great turner of the ball, instead relying on line and length. Unfortunately the 1950-51 tour was the first to use extensive air travel. Hollies was scared stiff of flying and had to be drunk before he could get on a plane. He failed to turn the ball on Australian wickets and was kept out of the team by Wright. Roy Tattersall and Bob Berry were off-spinners who were supposed to tie down the Australian batsmen, but like many of their kind failed to adjust to the faster, harder Australian pitches. John Warr quickly proved himself to be the worst player in the team, he took only one test wicket - for 281 runs - when Ian Johnson walked after the umpire declined to give him out, an almost unheard of practice in Australia at the time. He improved his game during the tour, but was never more than a decent county bowler. Let loose from the hard life at Yorkshire and the Army Brian Close was undisciplined and failed on a tour for which he should not have been chosen.

Fielding
It was not only that catches were missed. The picking up was slovenly and the returns to the wicket badly directed. There was no anticipation or cutting off of runs by the men in the deep, and quite often Brown had to halt a bowler in his run-up to direct a fieldsmen to his proper position.
John Kay

England failed to match the Australians' high standards of fielding and were nicknamed Brown's Cows by the Australian barrackers. They dropped six catches in a match against Victoria and made frequent mistakes in the state matches. However, they made a considerable improvement in the Tests with "...first class work in the field, in direct contrast to the slovenly and often lackadaisical displays in the previous games of the tour". Even so, they never reached the heights of catching and fielding displayed by the Australian team. Both Brown and Alec Bedser weighted 15 stone (over 200 lb or 100 kilos) and were particularly ungainly in the field, but their bucket-like hands picked up 9 catches and Brown twice caught and bowled Keith Miller. Godfrey Evans was the outstanding wicket-keeper of his generation whose enthusiasm could energise a fielding team and always entertained the crowd with his antics. His deputy was Arthur McIntyre, who kept wicket for Alec Bedser, Jim Laker and Tony Lock in the Surrey side that would win the County Championship seven times in a row in 1952–58. Len Hutton was a good slip and would pick up 9 catches in the series and Trevor Bailey took some great catches in the gully. Unfortunately the MCC had no other slip fielders and they were joined by Gilbert Parkhouse, who hated the role and frequently dropped catches. John Dewes was a good outfielder, but the rest of the team failed to impress and a picture of John Warr was used to illustrate how not to take catches.

MCC Touring Team
By the convention of the time gentleman amateurs have their initials in front of their surname and professional players have their initials after their name, if their initials were used at all.

First Test – Brisbane

See Main Article - 1950-51 Ashes series

Second Test – Melbourne

See Main Article - 1950-51 Ashes series

Third Test – Sydney

See Main Article - 1950-51 Ashes series

Fourth Test – Adelaide

See Main Article - 1950-51 Ashes series

Fifth Test – Melbourne

See Main Article - 1950-51 Ashes series

Ceylon
The English team had a stopover in Colombo en route to Australia and played a one-day single-innings match there against the Ceylon national team, which at that time did not have Test status.

References

Notes

Sources
 J.H. Fingleton, Brown and Company, The Tour in Australia, Collins, 1951
 John Kay, Ashes to Hassett, A review of the M.C.C. tour of Australia, 1950-51, John Sherratt & Son, 1951
 W.J. O'Reilly, Cricket Task-Force, The Story of the 1950-51 Australian Tour, Werner Laurie, 1951
 E.W. Swanton, Swanton in Australia with MCC 1946-1975, Fontana/Collins, 1975
References using Cricinfo or Wisden may require free registration for access.

Further reading
 John Arlott, John Arlott's 100 Greatest Batsmen, MacDonald Queen Anne Press, 1986
 Peter Arnold, The Illustrated Encyclopedia of World Cricket, W. H. Smith, 1985
 Ashley Brown, The Pictorial History of Cricket, Bison, 1988
 Bill Frindall, The Wisden Book of Test Cricket 1877-1978, Wisden, 1979
 Tom Graveney and Norman Miller, The Ten Greatest Test Teams  Sidgewick and Jackson, 1988
 Gideon Haigh, Mystery Spinner: The Story of Jack Iverson, Aurum Press Ltd, 2002
 Chris Harte, A History of Australian Cricket, Andre Deutsch, 1993
 Alan Hill, The Bedsers: Twinning Triumphs, Mainstream Publishing, 2002
 Keith Miller, Cricket Crossfire, Oldbourne Press, 1956
 Ray Robinson, On Top Down Under, Cassell, 1975
 E.W. Swanton (ed), Barclay's World of Cricket, Willow, 1986

External links
 CricketArchive tour itinerary

1950 in English cricket
1950 in Australian cricket
1951 in English cricket
1951 in Australian cricket
Australian cricket seasons from 1945–46 to 1969–70
International cricket competitions from 1945–46 to 1960
1950-51
Sri Lankan cricket seasons from 1880–81 to 1971–72
1950
1950-51
1950 in Ceylon